In philosophy, further facts  are facts that do not follow logically from the physical facts of the world. Reductionists who argue that at bottom there is nothing more than the physical facts thus argue against the existence of further facts. The concept of further facts plays a key role in some of the major works in analytic philosophy of the late 20th century, including in Derek Parfit's Reasons and Persons, and David Chalmers's The Conscious Mind.

One context in which the existence of further facts is debated is that of personal identity across time: in what sense is Alice today really the same person as Alice yesterday, given that across the two days the state of her brain is different and the atoms that constitute her are different?  One may believe that at bottom, there is nothing more than the atoms and their arrangement at different points in time; while we may for practical purposes come up with some notion of sameness of a person, this notion does not reflect anything deeper about reality.  Under this view there would be no further facts.  Alternatively, one may believe that there is a deeper sense in which Alice yesterday and Alice today really are the same person.  For example, if one believes in Cartesian souls, one may believe that Alice yesterday and Alice today are the same person if and only if they correspond to the same soul.  Or one may not believe in Cartesian souls, but yet believe that whether Alice yesterday and Alice today are the same person is a question about something other than facts about which atoms constitute them and how they are arranged. These would both be further-fact views.

The debate about further facts about personal identity over time is most closely associated with Derek Parfit.  In his Reasons and Persons, he describes the non-reductionist's view that "personal identity is a deep further fact, distinct from physical and psychological continuity".  Parfit takes a reductionist stance and argues against this further-fact view.  As a result it is not clear whether a person has any reason to be worried about his or her future self in a special way that does not also apply to worrying about others, with Parfit arguing that it is plausible that "only the deep further fact gives me a reason to be specially concerned about my future" (his so-called "Extreme Claim"). Sydney Shoemaker objects that it is not clear how a further fact would give a reason for such special concerns, either. Harold Langsam has attempted to give a positive account of how a further fact would give such a reason.

David Chalmers lists a number of other types of candidates for further facts.  One is facts about conscious experience.  For example, it is difficult to see how it follows from the physical facts what it is like to experience seeing red; indeed, inverted spectrum scenarios, where we imagine that experiences of colors are swapped without anything else changing, might suggest that things could have been different without the physical facts changing.  Another candidate for a further fact is the fact (as most philosophers consider it to be) that there is any conscious experience at all, rather than everyone being a philosophical zombie as claimed by a minority of philosophers. Christopher Hill and Brian Mclaughlin have argued against the idea that facts about consciousness are further facts, disputing the logical possibility of a world physically identical to ours in which the facts about consciousness are different.

Chalmers also considers facts about indexicality.  He cites the fact that "I am David Chalmers", noting that its significance seems to go beyond the tautology that David Chalmers is David Chalmers. (See also Caspar Hare's egocentric presentism and Benj Hellie's vertiginous question.) Similarly, in the philosophy of time, what date and time it is now might be considered a candidate for a further fact, in the sense that a being that knows everything about the full four-dimensional block of spacetime would still not know what time it is now. (See also the A-theory and the B-theory of time.)

A final type of fact that Chalmers considers is that of negative facts.  For example, consider the following statement: there do not exist nonphysical angels.  If in fact true, it does not seem that this logically follows from any of the physical facts by themselves; but, he argues, it would follow if one added a "That is all" statement at the end of the list of all the physical facts.

See also
 Benj Hellie's vertiginous question
 B-theory of time
 Centered world
 Consciousness
 Personal identity
 Simulation hypothesis

References

External links
 Conitzer, Vincent. A Puzzle about Further Facts. Open access version of article in Erkenntnis.

Conceptions of self
Epistemological theories
Identity (philosophy)
Metaphysics of mind
Philosophy of time
Theory of mind
Thought experiments in philosophy